The 2022–23 UNLV Runnin' Rebels basketball team represents the University of Nevada, Las Vegas during the 2022–23 NCAA Division I men's basketball season. The Runnin' Rebels are led by second-year head coach Kevin Kruger and play their home games for the 40th season at the Thomas & Mack Center in Paradise, Nevada. They participate as members of the Mountain West Conference for the 24th season.

Previous season 
The Runnin' Rebels finished the 2021–22 season 18–14, 10–8 in Mountain West play to finish in 5th place.  

They were defeated by Wyoming in the first round of the Mountain West tournament to end the season. 

Following the departure of coach T.J. Otzelberger to Iowa State, the roster saw a significant amount of turnover from the 2020-21 season. Only 3 players - Bryce Hamilton, Reece Brown and Trey Hurlburt - returned from the prior season.

Offseason

Departures 

Source

Incoming transfers 

Source

2022 recruiting class

Roster

Schedule and results 

|-
!colspan=12 style=| Non-conference regular season

|-
!colspan=12 style=| Mountain West regular season

 

  

  

 
 
 

 
|-
!colspan=12 style=| Mountain West tournament

Source

References 

UNLV
UNLV Runnin' Rebels basketball seasons
Run
Run